The Screaming Bloody Murder Tour is a concert tour by rock band Sum 41, taking place between 2010–11 and resuming again in 2012, in support of their fifth full-length studio album Screaming Bloody Murder.

The tour began in April 2010, and was set to take place until 2012, though following frontman Deryck Whibley sustaining a serious back injury, the tour was cut short in August 2011, and all following dates until the end of 2011 were cancelled, to let Whibley undergo a treatment and recover. The band rescheduled the tour for 2012, with the tour resuming in February 2012.

Background
The tour began on April 17, 2010, dubbed as the European In Your Pants Tour, the band played a series of festivals and some headlining dates in April 2010, with plans to follow in May–June 2010 including appearances in Rock am Ring, Rock im Park and Nova Rock, which were all canceled upon drummer Steve Jocz' involvement in a car accident. After Stevo's recovery, the band started their North American leg on June 25, 2010, and toured as part of the Vans Warped Tour 2010 in the US and Canada, though they canceled few of the dates in the Warped Tour to take part at the Japanese Summer Sonic Festival on August 7 & 8, 2010. Upon Deryck being hospitalized for a slipped disc in his back after he was attacked at a bar in Japan, the band had to cancel the five remaining Warped Tour dates they had to play in August upon returning from Japan. The band continued their European tour on August 31, 2010, with a series of rescheduled dates of the summer European In Your Pants Tour until September 12. Following this, the band embarked on headlining European tour between October 27–December 1, 2010, headlining the annual Eastpak Antidote Tour, with support from The Black Pacific, Riverboat Gamblers and Veara, being the band's longest and most extended tour in Europe. During the tour, the band debuted a new song, "Skumfuk", the first song to be released from Screaming Bloody Murder, which was leaked to the internet earlier in July 2010.

On February 4, 2011, the band went on another European leg, dubbed as the first official European tour in support of Screaming Bloody Murder, which was announced for release on March 29, 2011. On this leg, the band played a total of 13 dates in mostly small venues, almost all of them sold out, and debuted the single "Screaming Bloody Murder" live for the first time. On February 16, 2010, the band began touring Australia as part of the Soundwave Festival dates through February–March 2011. After playing two dates in Brisbane and Sydney, it was announced on February 28, that Deryck was hospitalized with severe pneumonia and the band will be cancelling the rest of their Australian tour. In March 2011, the band celebrated the release of the Screaming Bloody Murder album in a short set of 8 shows in the US, including two homeland dates in Canada. The album's release show took place at the Glass House in Pomona, California.

In May 2011, the headlined a tour in Japan, dubbed as the 10th Anniversary Japanese Tour 2011. The tour's shows were the first where the band debuted new songs from the new album Screaming Bloody Murder except "Skumfuk" and the title track, which the band were already playing for a few months now. During the tour, the band was also the first international act to play in Sendai after the 2011 Tōhoku earthquake and tsunami. In the summer of 2011, the band embarked on a European summer leg, mostly playing European festivals such as Hurricane, Southside and Sonisphere Festival, also visiting for the first time such countries as Hungary, Slovakia, Croatia and Ukraine. In August 2011, the band was set to perform two shows in South Africa, the band's first shows in Africa ever, though the first show in Durban on August 5 was cancelled 2 hours after the band was set to take the stage, following severe strong winds rendered the stage area unsafe. The second South African show at the Oppikoppi Festival on August 7 took place as planned and was also streamed online via Ustream.

Following the South African dates, the band was set to return to North America playing a small bunch of Canadian shows as well as 5 Warped Tour dates, making up for the cancelled dates from last year's Warped Tour, though 3 dates into the tour, on August 13, 2011, it was announced that Deryck has re-injured his back and the band was forced to cancel once again the 2 remaining Warped Tour dates, as well as 4 Canadian dates. In early September 2011, the band was set to go on their first ever Latin American tour, where they were supposed to visit for the first time Mexico, Brazil, Chile and Argentina. In late September, the band was set to return to Australia, playing the new Soundwave Revolution Festival dates, making up for the cancelled Australian dates in February, though on August 9, 2011, it was announced that the Soundwave Revolution Festival would be cancelled following headliners Van Halen pulling out and the organizers failing to close a deal with a second headlining band to appear on the festival, later confirmed to be Aerosmith.

On August 23, 2011, it was announced on the band's official website that following Deryck Whibley's back injury on August 13, which forced the back to already cancel their US and Canadian dates in August, the band would be indefinitely postponing all upcoming tour dates for 2011, due to Deryck undergoing a treatment for his medical condition. It was confirmed that the band's first ever South American tour as well as their first ever Asian tour (excluding Japan), would all be cancelled, and rescheduled for some time in 2012.

On September 28, 2011, the first dates of the rescheduled 2012 Screaming Bloody Murder Tour were announced, these being a series of 11 dates in the UK and Ireland, co-headlining with New Found Glory, in February 2012. On November 1, 2011, it was announced that Sum 41 will co-headline the PunkSpring Festival in Japan, on March 31, 2012 in Tokyo and on April 1, 2012, in Osaka, with The Offspring, New Found Glory and All Time Low. It was then announced that the PunkSpring performances will be followed by a rescheduled Asian tour making up for the cancelled dates in October 2011, visiting such countries as China, Taiwan, Indonesia and Singapore. Dates in Malaysia and the Philippines though were not rescheduled.

On January 20, 2012, it was announced on the Kerrang website that Sum 41 was forced to pull off from the Kerrang UK tour in February, where they were supposed to co-headline with New Found Glory. It was said that frontman Deryck Whibley, who has suffered from a serious back injury back in August 2011, is still not well enough to play the tour, and so the band would be replaced by The Blackout.

After finishing the rescheduled Asian leg of the tour in April 2012, there was no more information released from the band about further touring. After being asked, bassist Cone McCaslin has said that due to Deryck's back treatment it is unlikely that the band will be touring in the coming months, and most likely start touring again around the fall, though on May 23, 2012, the band has announced that they will be touring in the summer after all, announcing a few European festival dates, with more to follow throughout the months of July and August. During the summer European tour of 2012, the band played a long-than-usual set, playing many songs that were never played live, such as "Billy Spleen" and "Count Your Last Blessings", and songs that haven't been played in years, such as "A.N.I.C.", "Hyper-Insomnia-Para-Condrioid", "No Reason" and "Rhythms", with the setlist varying almost every night.

On September 10, 2012, the band announced their first full headlining North American tour in 4 years, being the Does This Look Infected? 10th Anniversary Tour, in which the band is set to play the whole Does This Look Infected? album, as well as their greatest hits and songs from Screaming Bloody Murder.

This was the group's final concert tour with drummer Steve Jocz, who left the band in 2013.

Set list

Tour dates

Support acts

 A Place in the Sun (April 23, 2010)
 Atomic Shelters (July 20, 2012)
 Attack Attack! (September 4–11, 2011)
 Carrion (December 2, 2010)
 Dead Country (March 25–29, 2011)
 Destine (July 8, 2012)
 Everlyn (February 15, 2011)
 Fitacola (February 17–19, 2011)
 Follow You Home (July 8, 2012)
 Four Square (April 21–23, 2010)
 Four Year Strong (September 4–11, 2011)
 From Our Hands (September 7–8, 2010)
 Hill Valley (June 20–23, 2011; July 11–12, 2011)
 If I Die Today (February 13, 2011)
 Itchy Poopzkid (September 6, 2010)
 Kemble Walters and the Blank Faces (April 1, 2011)
 Kinoklub (June 29, 2011)
 letlive. (February 4–17, 2012)
 No Regrets (February 16, 2011)

 Noize MC (July 6, 2011)
 O.Torvald (July 5, 2011)
 Pierce the Veil (September 4–11, 2011)
 popKorn (September 11, 2010)
 Radio Havanna (February 6–9, 2011)
 Riverboat Gamblers (October 27–December 1, 2010)
 Spark Gap (July 13, 2011)
 Templeton Pek (February 22, 2011; August 9, 2012)
 The Blackout (March 1–2, 2011)
 The Black Pacific (October 27–December 1, 2010)
 The Darlings (March 25–29, 2011)
 The Starliners (February 5, 2011)
 There for Tomorrow (March 1–2, 2011)
 Tonight Alive (March 29, 2011)
 Turboweekend (December 2, 2010)
 Veara (October 27–December 1, 2010; March 1–2, 2011)
 While She Sleeps (February 4–17, 2012)
 Тёплые Дни (September 10, 2010; July 6, 2011)

Co-headlining
 Billy Talent (July 19, 2011)
 New Found Glory (February 4–17, 2012)

As a supporting act
 My Chemical Romance (June 27, 2011)

Personnel
 Deryck Whibley – lead vocals, rhythm guitar
 Tom Thacker – lead guitar, backing vocals
 Cone McCaslin – bass, backing vocals
 Steve Jocz – drums, backing vocals

Songs Played

From Half Hour of Power
 Makes No Difference

From All Killer No Filler
 Fat Lip
 Rhythms
 Motivation
 In Too Deep
 Pain for Pleasure

From Does This Look Infected?
 The Hell Song
 Over My Head (Better Off Dead)
 My Direction
 Still Waiting
 A.N.I.C.
 No Brains
 Mr. Amsterdam

From Chuck
 Intro
 No Reason
 We're All to Blame
 Welcome to Hell
 Pieces
 88

From Underclass Hero
 Underclass Hero
 Walking Disaster
 Count Your Last Blessings
 King of Contradiction

From Screaming Bloody Murder
 Reason to Believe
 Screaming Bloody Murder
 Skumfuk
 Holy Image of Lies
 Sick of Everyone
 Happiness Machines
 Blood In My Eyes
 Baby, You Don't Wanna Know
 Back Where I Belong
 Exit Song

Other
 Paint It Black (The Rolling Stones cover)
 Rebel Yell (Billy Idol cover)
 American Girl (Tom Petty and the Heartbreakers cover)
 We Will Rock You (Queen cover)
 Master of Puppets (Metallica cover)
 Enter Sandman (Metallica cover)

References

2010 concert tours
2011 concert tours
2012 concert tours
Sum 41